Gözpınar (literally "eye spring") is a Turkish place name that may refer to the following places in Turkey:

 Gözpınar, Aydın, a village in the district of Aydın, Aydın Province
 Gözpınar, Bartın, a village in the district of Bartın, Bartın Province
 Gözpınar, Elâzığ
 Gözpınar, Gerger, a village in the district of Gerger, Adıyaman Province